Aranchi (also Romanized as Arānchī) is a village in Ojarud-e Shomali Rural District, in the Central District of Germi County, Ardabil Province, Iran. At the 2006 census, its population was 604, in 123 families.

References 

Towns and villages in Germi County